Bayerotrochus africanus, common name the South African slit shell, is a species of sea snail, a marine gastropod mollusc in the family Pleurotomariidae.

Description
The shell grows to a length of 120 mm.

Distribution
This species is distributed along South Africa.

References

 Williams S.T., Karube S. & Ozawa T. (2008) Molecular systematics of Vetigastropoda: Trochidae, Turbinidae and Trochoidea redefined. Zoologica Scripta 37: 483–506.

External links
 

Pleurotomariidae
Gastropods described in 1948